Sewallis Shirley may refer to:

Sewallis Edward Shirley, 10th Earl Ferrers (1847–1912), British peer
Sewallis Shirley (MP) (1844–1904), British politician
Sewallis Shirley (1709–1765), British MP for Brackley and Callington